In the United States Marine Corps, the command element (CE) is the command and control force of a Marine Air-Ground Task Force (MAGTF). It provides C3I for the MAGTF.


Role within the MAGTF 
The Command Element (CE), a headquarters unit organized into a MAGTF (MEU, MEB, MEF) headquarters (HQ) group, that exercises command and control (management and planning for manpower, intelligence, operations and training, and logistics functions) over the other elements of the MAGTF. The HQ group consists of communications, intelligence, surveillance, and law enforcement (i.e., military police) detachments, companies, and battalions, and reconnaissance (Force Reconnaissance), and liaison (ANGLICO) platoons, detachments, and companies.

Organization 
The size of the CE varies in proportion to the size of the MAGTF. A Marine Expeditionary Force has a MEF Information Group, approximately the size of a regiment. A Marine Expeditionary Brigade holds a battalion-sized MEB Information Group. The various Marine Expeditionary Units command a company-sized MEU Information Group. Generally, MEF postings are permanent, while MEBs and MEUs rotate their GCE, ACE, and LCE twice annually.

Hierarchy of Marine command units

I Marine Expeditionary Force Information Group

II Marine Expeditionary Force Information Group

III Marine Expeditionary Force Information Group

Marine Forces Reserve CE units

See also 
 Marine Expeditionary Force
 Marine Air-Ground Task Force

References 
 

Web

 I MHG official website
 II MHG official website
 III MHG official website
 MFR official website

United States Marine Corps organization